Dusty daisy-bush is the common name for two different species of Olearia:

 Olearia brevipedunculata N.G.Walsh
 Olearia phlogopappa (Labill.) DC.